Toxorhynchites rajah is a species of mosquito in the genus Toxorhynchites.  It is endemic to Sabah, Malaysian Borneo.  In its larval stage, T. rajah is found exclusively in the pitchers of Nepenthes rajah (hence the name), a species of pitcher plant.  As such, it is considered a nepenthebiont.

References
 Two New Mosquito Species from a Pitcher Plant of Mt. Kinabalu, Sabah, Malaysia
 Clarke, C.M. 1997. Nepenthes of Borneo.  Natural History Publications (Borneo), Kota Kinabalu, p. 39.

rajah
Insects described in 1986
Nepenthes infauna